Anita Perez Ferguson, born in 1949 in Santa Barbara, California, is a speaker, author and international consultant.

She has a BA in Communications from Westmont College (1971), an MA in Counseling Psychology from the University of Santa Clara, and an MA in Management from the University of Redlands.

Background
In 1990, Ms. Perez Ferguson was the Democratic candidate for the US House of Representatives in California's 19th congressional district. In 1992, she was the Democratic candidate for the U.S. House of Representatives in California's 23rd congressional district.

Perez Ferguson has been a Lecturer for the Woodrow Wilson Foundation at Princeton,  a contributor to National Public Radio. She is a past president of the National Women's Political Caucus.

Under President Bill Clinton, she served as the White House Liaison to the US Department of Transportation. Clinton also appointed her to serve as Chair of the Inter-American Foundation.

She has also been a television panelist featured on shows like To the Contrary. Hispanic Business magazine named her to its list, "The 100 Most Influential Hispanics in the United States."

Published works
1999 A Passion for Politics
2007 Women Seen and Heard

See also
Mexican American writers

References

External links

 Anita Perez Ferguson - MIPtalk.com interview

Living people
1949 births
Activists for Hispanic and Latino American civil rights
Westmont College alumni
Santa Clara University alumni
University of Redlands alumni